NGC 414 is a pair of lenticular galaxies (PGC 4254 and PGC 93079) of types S0 and E/S0, respectively, located in the constellation Pisces. It was discovered on October 22, 1867 by Herman Schultz. It was described by Dreyer as "very faint, small, irregularly round, much brighter middle, II 220 to the northwest.", with II 220 being NGC 410.

References

External links
 

0414
18671022
Pisces (constellation)
Lenticular galaxies
Discoveries by Herman Schultz (astronomer)
004254